Kai Reus (born 11 March 1985 in Niedorp, North Holland), is a Dutch former professional road bicycle racer who last rode for .

As a junior, Reus won the Junior men's road race during the 2003 UCI Road World Championships.

After missing out on the 2007 Tour de France Reus was training at the Col de l'Iseran on 12 July 2007. Reus fell from his bike and slipped into a coma. After team mate Michael Rasmussen won the yellow jersey during the Tour he dedicated the jersey to Reus. Eventually Reus would remain in coma until 23 July. Reus returned to racing in the 2008 Tour of Missouri.

Reus took a year off from cycling between 2010 and 2011 after he was diagnosed with mononucleosis and lost form.

At the end of the 2016 season, Reus announced his retirement.

Major results

2003
 1st  Road race, UCI Junior Road World Championships
 1st Overall UCI Junior World Cup
 1st  Time trial, National Junior Road Championships
 1st Overall Tour de l'Abitibi
 1st Overall Tour du Pays de Vaud
1st Prologue
 1st Overall Driedaagse van Axel
1st Mountains classification
1st Stage 4
 1st Overall Junior Tour of Ireland
1st Stages 2 & 3
 1st Overall Euregio Autolease Heuvelland Tour
1st Stage 2
 3rd Omloop Mandel-Leie-Schelde Juniors
 4th Overall Tour de Lorraine Juniors
1st Stage 4 (ITT)
2004
 1st  Overall Triptyque des Barrages
 4th Overall Olympia's Tour
 4th Chrono des Nations U23
 4th Overall Tweedaagse der Gaverstreek
 4th Time trial, National Under-23 Road Championships
 6th Overall GP Tell
1st Stage 1
 8th Ronde van Noord-Holland
2005
 1st  Overall Tour de Normandie
1st Stage 4
 1st  Overall Thüringen-Rundfahrt
1st Stage 2
 1st Grand Prix Pino Cerami
 1st Stages 3 & 5b (ITT) Circuito Montañés
 3rd Ronde van Noord-Holland
 5th Time trial, National Under-23 Road Championships
 6th Overall Course de Solidarność et des Champions Olympiques
2006
 National Under-23 Road Championships
1st  Road race
1st  Time trial
 1st  Overall Tour de Normandie
1st Prologue & Stage 5
 1st Ronde van Noord-Holland
 1st Liège–Bastogne–Liège U23
 3rd Rund um Köln
 6th Overall Volta ao Distrito de Santarém
 7th Overall GP CTT Correios de Portugal
2009
 4th Overall Tour of Britain
1st Stage 2
2011
 1st Stage 1 Mi-Août en Bretagne
2012
 1st Stage 7 Volta a Portugal
2015
 6th Overall Ronde van Midden-Nederland
1st Stage 1 (TTT)
 8th Duo Normand

References

External links 
 
 

1985 births
Living people
People from Niedorp
Dutch male cyclists
UCI Road World Championships cyclists for the Netherlands
Cyclists from North Holland
20th-century Dutch people
21st-century Dutch people